Jung Da-un (born 7 December 1993), anglicized as Da Un Jung, is a South Korean mixed martial artist who competes in the Light heavyweight division of the Ultimate Fighting Championship. A professional competitor since 2015, he has also formerly competed for HEAT where he was the Light heavyweight Champion.

Mixed martial arts career

Early career

Starting his career in 2015, Jung compiled a 11–2 record fighting for various East Asian regional promotions, with his most memorable accomplishment being winning the HEAT Light Heavyweight Championship via TKO against Yuto Nakajima.

Ultimate Fighting Championship

Jung made his UFC debut against fellow newcomer Khadis Ibragimov on August 31, 2019 at UFC Fight Night 157. He won the fight via standing guillotine in the third round.

Jung faced Mike Rodríguez on December 21, 2019 at UFC Fight Night 165. He won the fight via knockout in the first round.

Da Un Jung was scheduled to face Ed Herman on May 2, 2020 at UFC Fight Night: Hermansson vs. Weidman. However, on April 9, Dana White, the president of UFC announced that the event was postponed to a future date. The bout with Herman was rescheduled for August 1, 2020 at UFC Fight Night 175. However, Jung was removed from the bout on July 23 due to alleged travel restrictions related to the COVID-19 pandemic.

Jung faced Sam Alvey on October 24, 2020 at UFC 254. After a back and forth battle, the fight was declared a draw.

As the first bout of his new contract, Jung was scheduled to face Shamil Gamzatov on April 10, 2021 at UFC on ABC 2. However, Gamzatov was removed from the bout on March 24 due to alleged Visa issues and replaced by William Knight. Jung won the bout via unanimous decision.

Jung was scheduled to face Kennedy Nzechukwu on October 16, 2021 at UFC Fight Night 195. However, the bout was postponed to UFC Fight Night 197 on November 13, 2021 for unknown reasons. Jung won the bout via knockout in round one.

Jung faced Dustin Jacoby on July 16, 2022, at UFC on ABC 3. He lost the fight via knockout in the first round.

Jung faced Devin Clark on February 4, 2023 at UFC Fight Night 218. He lost the fight via unanimous decision.

Championships and accomplishments
HEAT
 HEAT Light Heavyweight Championship (one time)

Mixed martial arts record

|-
|Loss
|align=center|15–4–1
|Devin Clark
|Decision (unanimous)
|UFC Fight Night: Lewis vs. Spivak
|
|align=center|3
|align=center|5:00
|Las Vegas, Nevada, United States
|
|-
|Loss
|align=center|15–3–1
|Dustin Jacoby
|KO (punch)
|UFC on ABC: Ortega vs. Rodríguez
|
|align=center|1
|align=center|3:13
|Elmont, New York, United States
|
|-
|Win
|align=center|15–2–1
|Kennedy Nzechukwu
|KO (elbows)
|UFC Fight Night: Holloway vs. Rodríguez
|
|align=center|1
|align=center|3:04
|Las Vegas, Nevada, United States
|
|-
|Win
|align=center|14–2–1
|William Knight
|Decision (unanimous)
|UFC on ABC: Vettori vs. Holland
|
|align=center|3
|align=center|5:00
|Las Vegas, Nevada, United States
|
|-
| Draw
|align=center|13–2–1
|Sam Alvey
||Draw (split)
|UFC 254 
|
|align=center|3
|align=center|5:00
|Abu Dhabi, United Arab Emirates
|
|-
|Win
|align=center|13–2
|Mike Rodríguez
|KO (punches)
|UFC Fight Night: Edgar vs. The Korean Zombie 
|
|align=center|1
|align=center|1:04
|Busan, South Korea
|
|-
|Win
|align=center|12–2
|Khadis Ibragimov
|Submission (guillotine choke)
|UFC Fight Night: Andrade vs. Zhang 
|
|align=center|3
|align=center|2:00
|Shenzhen, China
|
|-
|Win
|align=center|11–2
|Saša Milinkovic
|TKO (elbows)
|HEAT 44
|
|align=center|3
|align=center|0:58
|Nagoya, Japan
|
|-
|Win
|align=center|10–2
|Abutalib Halilov
|TKO (elbows)
|Way of The Dragon Championships 3
|
|align=center|2
|align=center|3:10
|Taipei City, Taiwan
|
|-
| Win
| align=center| 9–2
| Yuto Nakajima
| TKO (punches)
| HEAT 43
| 
| align=center| 2
| align=center| 1:33
| Kariya, Japan
| 
|-
| Win
| align=center| 8–2
| Peterson Almeida
| TKO (punches and elbows)
| HEAT 42
| 
| align=center| 2
| align=center| 3:55
| Kariya, Japan
|
|-
| Win
| align=center| 7–2
| Hulk
| KO (punches)
| HEAT 41
| 
| align=center| 1
| align=center| 2:20
| Nagoya, Japan
| 
|-
| Win
| align=center| 6–2
| Ryo Sakai
| Decision (unanimous)
| TFC 15
| 
| align=center| 3
| align=center| 5:00
| Seoul, South Korea
|
|-
| Win
| align=center| 5–2
| Lee Hyun-soo
| TKO (punches)
| TFC Dream 2
| 
| align=center| 1
| align=center| 1:54
| Gyeongsan, South Korea
| 
|-
| Win
| align=center| 4–2
| Shunsuke Inoue
| TKO (punches)
| HEAT 38
| 
| align=center| 2
| align=center| 3:26
| Nagoya, Japan
| 
|-
| Win
| align=center| 3–2
| Handong Kong
| Submission (arm triangle choke)
| Art of War 18
| 
| align=center| 1
| align=center| 7:30
| Beijing, China
| 
|-
| Win
| align=center| 2–2
| Lucas Tani
| TKO (punches)
| HEAT 37
| 
| align=center| 3
| align=center| 2:24
| Nagoya, Japan
| 
|-
| Loss
| align=center| 1–2
| Roque Martinez
| Submission (kimura)
| Top FC 9
| 
| align=center| 1
| align=center| 4:30
| Incheon, South Korea
| 
|-
| Loss
| align=center| 1–1
| Lim Jun-soo
| Decision (majority)
| Top FC 8
| 
| align=center| 3
| align=center| 5:00
| Seoul, South Korea
| 
|-
| Win
| align=center| 1–0
| Lee Hyung-chul
| TKO (punches)
| Top FC 7
| 
| align=center| 1
| align=center| 1:45
| Changwon, South Korea
|

Filmography

Television show

See also 
 List of current UFC fighters
 List of male mixed martial artists

References

External links 
  
  

1993 births
Living people
South Korean male mixed martial artists
Light heavyweight mixed martial artists
Jung
Ultimate Fighting Championship male fighters
Jung
People from Asan